Marisa Soares Marques (born 13 August 1993) is a Luxembourger footballer who plays as a midfielder for Dames Ligue 1 club Mamer and the Luxembourg women's national team.

International career
Soares Marques made her senior debut for Luxembourg on 10 November 2018 during a 2–0 friendly win against Andorra.

References

1993 births
Living people
Women's association football midfielders
Luxembourgian women's footballers
Luxembourg women's international footballers
Luxembourgian people of Portuguese descent